The 1961 Giro d'Italia was the 44th edition of the Giro d'Italia, one of cycling's Grand Tours. The field consisted of 170 riders, and 92 riders finished the race.

By rider

By nationality

References

1961 Giro d'Italia
1961